Qeshlaq-e Khan Goldi may refer to:
Qeshlaq-e Khan Goldi Bala Owghlan
Qeshlaq-e Khan Goldi Davakishi
Qeshlaq-e Khan Goldi Hajj Ahmad
Qeshlaq-e Khan Goldi Kamaran
Qeshlaq-e Khan Goldi Mostanlu
Qeshlaq-e Khan Goldi Ogham Owghlan